is a Japanese politician of the New Komeito Party, a member of the House of Councillors in the Diet (national legislature). A native of Kanagawa Prefecture and former member of Takarazuka Revue, she was elected to the House of Councillors for the first time in 1995 as a candidate for the New Frontier Party. She lost her re-election in July 2007 but in September 2007 took over the seat in the house that was vacated when Yutaka Kobayashi, a member of the house, resigned.

Her husband Tomoo Nishikawa is a lawyer and a former Representative of Japan.

References

External links 
 Official website 

1947 births
Living people
People from Kawasaki, Kanagawa
Spouses of Japanese politicians
Female members of the House of Councillors (Japan)
Members of the House of Councillors (Japan)
Japanese actresses
Japanese actor-politicians
New Komeito politicians